Robert Wayne Turner II (born August 20, 1984) is a retired American football offensive lineman who played in the NFL from 2007 to 2014. He was signed by the New York Jets as an undrafted free agent in 2007 and later played for the St. Louis Rams, Tennessee Titans and Chicago Bears.

High school and college career
Turner was born in Texas and starred for Texas football powerhouse Lake Travis High School, before their rise to greatness; graduating in 2003. The Lake Travis Cavaliers went 1-19 his last two years, 1-9 in 2001, 0-10 in 2002.

In his four years of college, Turner started 45 games for the New Mexico Lobos as a right guard and right tackle. A wrist injury plagued him during his final two years which caused teams to shy away from drafting him.

Professional career

New York Jets
Turner was signed by the New York Jets as an undrafted free agent out of New Mexico on May 16, 2007. Turner was waived during the final roster cuts on September 1, 2007 before signing on to the team's practice squad on September 3. Turner was promoted to the active roster on December 19, 2007. Turner made his professional debut against the Tennessee Titans on December 23, 2007. Turner was well known for his versatility and was utilized on offense, defense and special teams with the Jets.

Turner was placed on the injured reserve list on September 27, 2011 after suffering a broken ankle in the preseason.

St. Louis Rams
Turner signed with the St. Louis Rams on March 30, 2012.

Tennessee Titans
Turner signed with the Tennessee Titans on March 19, 2013.

Chicago Bears
Turner signed with the Chicago Bears on August 10, 2014. The Bears released Turner on August 29, 2014.

References

External links
Tennessee Titans bio
New York Jets bio

1984 births
Living people
Players of American football from Austin, Texas
American football offensive tackles
American football offensive guards
American football centers
New Mexico Lobos football players
New York Jets players
St. Louis Rams players
Tennessee Titans players
Chicago Bears players